Saturday TV Funhouse is  a segment on NBC's Saturday Night Live featuring cartoons created by SNL writer Robert Smigel. 101 "TV Funhouse" segments aired on SNL between 1996 and 2008, with one further segment airing in 2011. It also spawned a short-lived spinoff series of TV Funhouse that aired on Comedy Central.

Production
Programmed to air between the host segments of Saturday Night Live, TV Funhouse parodied such genres as 1950s educational films, Saturday morning Hanna-Barbera/Filmation cartoons of the 1970s and 1980s, and the 1960s stop motion holiday specials of Rankin/Bass. Any episodes of Saturday Night Live that has TV Funhouse in it would be listed by the announcer as "A cartoon by Robert Smigel".

The animation was produced by J.J. Sedelmaier Productions for its first three seasons until Wachtenheim/Marianetti Animation took over primary animation production duties.

Recurring SNL TV Funhouse skits

 Fun with Real Audio - This sketch presented animated scenes to found, real-life audio tracks.
 The All-New Adventures of Mr. T - A parody of the Ruby-Spears animated series Mister T. This cartoon depicts Mr. T (voiced by Tracy Morgan) as desperate to find work after 10 years, aggressively auditioning for unlikely parts such as classical theatre and tampon commercials with help from Jeff Harris (voiced by Andy Daly), Kim Nakamura (voiced by Ana Gasteyer), Spike O'Neill (voiced by Andrew Daly), and Bulldozer the Bulldog. Whenever he encounters obstacles such as directors telling him auditions are already over, he simply responds with the phrase "Ain't got time for jibber-jabber, I need work!" Mr. T also throws in different advice during his dialogue like "Drink your milk", "Stay in school", "Don't do drugs", and "Eat all your greens". After getting the employment, he would often mix up of all his advice to his companions when stating how one could get work as Bulldozer barks after that.
 The Ambiguously Gay Duo - A parody of the comic book superhero duets. The vaguely homosexual superheroes Ace and Gary (voiced by Stephen Colbert and Steve Carell respectively) fight crime in Metroville while their adversaries like Bighead (voiced by Robert Smigel) and Dr. Braino (voiced by Stephen Colbert) try to figure out their true sexuality. Bill Chott provides the narration for this cartoon. All the shorts were re-written from The Dana Carvey Show. In the live-action version on the SNL episode hosted by Ed Helms, Jon Hamm and Jimmy Fallon play Ace and Gary while Stephen Colbert and Steve Carell played Dr. Brainio and Bighead.
 The Anatominals Show - A parody of a Yogi Bear–type Hanna-Barbera–style cartoon where Kogi Bear, Pook Bear, Mindy Bear, Sheila Coyote, Betsy Cow, and other animal characters are anatomically correct even when they are confronted by the park ranger during attempts to take picnic baskets. Both episodes were interspersed with scenes of Lorne Michaels (voiced by Robert Smigel) expressing deep disappointment with the show or trying to prevent visitors to Studio 8H from seeing the cartoon. 
 The Michael Jackson Show - A parody of Hanna-Barbera cartoons, highlighting the misadventures of Michael Jackson (voiced by Dino Stamatopoulos) and his odd friends. Included in his rag-tag entourage are his talking common chimpanzee Bubbles, an aged Emmanuel Lewis, a talking anthropomorphic llama whose just called Llama, the living skeleton of Joseph Merrick the Elephant Man (voiced by Robert Smigel impersonating Jimmy Durante), a zebra with a pushmi-pullyu design, the sentient and speaking arm of Elizabeth Taylor, and a sentient urn containing Marilyn Monroe's ashes. Michael's friends often try to get him not to do stuff with little boys which goes comically awry for them. Sometimes when he gets satisfied with a little boy or the aged Emmanuel Lewis, Michael Jackson would have the same reactions that Quick Draw McGraw character Snuffles would have when he gets his dog biscuit. The theme song is to the tune of The Yogi Bear Show.
 The X-Presidents - A parody of Hanna-Barbera/Filmation cartoons from the 1970s. This sketch features former US Presidents Gerald Ford, Jimmy Carter, Ronald Reagan, and George H.W. Bush (all voiced by Jim Morris) as crime-fighting superheroes imbued with superpowers by a "hurricane-powered dose of radiation" received at a celebrity golf tournament. Each of their wives is a member as well. Bill Clinton, despite his status as a living former president, is not a member since he did not receive the hurricane-powered dose of radiation, as he was in office during the initial incident.

Disney parodies
The February 10, 2001 episode, "Ray of Light," parodies the controversy over Ray Lewis's involvement in an Atlanta homicide. Although Lewis went on to become the Super Bowl XXXV MVP, he was unable to utter the famous line "I'm going to Disney World!" The skit was involved with Disney "making it up" to Lewis by placing him in various Disney animated movies. Lewis would be shown fleeing the scene of Disney character death scenes, frequently uttering "I didn't see nothin'!"

"Bambi 2002," a poke at Disney's penchant for direct-to video sequels at the time, imagines a sequel to the original movie where Bambi's mother turns up alive. The title character fights stylized terrorist types, meets Jared Fogle, and performs a rap music number in the forest. Also in the sketch are moments involving some of Disney's darker issues, as well as some pornographic humor.

On April 15, 2006, Robert Smigel again parodied Disney's home video moratorium policy, as well as Walt Disney's alleged racism and anti-Semitism. When two kids are brought to the Disney Vault by Mickey Mouse, they find Walt's frozen head, several controversial things that were never released, and Jim Henson and Kermit the Frog bound and gagged in a chair, Mickey Mouse breaks down and quotes "He wouldn't sell! He wouldn't sell...!" (a reference to a broken deal between The Jim Henson Company and The Walt Disney Company circa 1990 following Henson's death; Disney bought the Muppets franchise in 2004, 2 years prior to the sketch).

NBC special
On April 29, 2006, NBC aired a full-length, 90-minute SNL "best of" special for TV Funhouse. The special was hosted by The Ambiguously Gay Duo interacting with the current SNL cast with a cameo from Jimmy Fallon.

The special was released on DVD October 24, 2006.

Comedy Central series

The spinoff series was somewhat of a twisted Pee-Wee's Playhouse-style children's TV show, hosted by Doug Dale and his "Anipals" puppet friends.

Plot
Every episode had a different theme to it (e.g., "Hawaiian Day" or "Astronaut Day") and saw the Anipals usually getting into some sort of trouble, not wanting to do whatever their happy-go-lucky host had in mind for the day.

The theme song describes this show as the "last cartoon show of the day".

This show didn't show any cartoons from The Ambiguously Gay Duo, The Michael Jackson Show, and/or The X-Presidents despite some of its characters appearing in the theme song.

Production
The Comedy Central version of TV Funhouse premiered in December 2000 and was not picked up for a second season. Interviews with Smigel indicate that Comedy Central believed in the show, but was disappointed in how it went over budget every episode. Smigel has also expressed how difficult the show was and how tedious the puppet-live animal segments were to shoot.

The show was released on DVD July 22, 2008 under the title Comedy Central's TV Funhouse.

Recurring skits
 Wonderman — A parody of Max Fleischer's Superman cartoons that stars Wonderman (voiced by Robert Smigel) who fights a constant crusade to stop crime and get his alias of Henry Moore laid.
 Mnemonics: Your Dear, Dear Friend — A parody of educational films about teaching children using a mnemonic for everyday subjects using age-inappropriate mnemonics to improve their memory. Robert Smigel narrates this segment.
 The Baby, the Immigrant, and the Guy on Mushrooms — Artemis the Cat watches over a baby (voiced by Sarah Thyre), an immigrant, and a guy on mushrooms while the female homeowner (voiced by Sarah Thyre) is away. Artemis works to keep the clueless trio out of any danger which always ends with him getting hurt.
 A Michael Kupperman Cartoon - An assortment of cartoons drawn by Michael Kupperman.

Episodes

Cast
 Doug Dale - Doug

Anipal Voices
 Tommy Blacha — Hank
 Doug Dale — Jeffery
 Matt Davis
 Jon Glaser — Hojo
 Jonathan Groff
 Jackie Hoffman
 David Juskow — Larry
 Susan Krause
 Frank Simms
 Robert Smigel — Fogey, Xabu, Rocky, Terrence
 Brian Stack — Mr. Whiskers (first episode)
 Dino Stamatopoulos — Chickie, Mr. Whiskers

References

External links
 
 Some of the TV Funhouse episodes

2000s American adult animated television series
2000s American satirical television series
2000s American sketch comedy television series
2000 American television series debuts
2001 American television series endings
American adult animated comedy television series
American adult animated television spin-offs
American television shows featuring puppetry
English-language television shows
Comedy Central animated television series
Comedy Central original programming
American television series with live action and animation
Saturday Night Live sketches
Saturday Night Live in the 2000s